The European qualifying for the 2015 FIFA Women's World Cup was a women's football tournament organized by UEFA. A record 46 entrants were competing for eight spots. For the first time Albania and Montenegro entered a senior competitive tournament. The first matches were held on 4 April 2013.

Preliminary round

The eight lowest teams entered the tournament in the preliminary round were drawn into two groups of four. The two best placed teams in each group advanced to the next round where they competed among the other thirty-eight teams entered. The preliminary round was drawn on 18 December 2012. Malta and Lithuania as hosts were the only seeded teams. Matches were played from 4 to 9 April 2013.

Group A

Group B

Group stage
The group stage draw was made on 16 April 2013. Teams played each other twice, once at home and once away. Matches were played from 20 September 2013 to 17 September 2014. All seven group winners advanced directly to the final tournament, while the four runners-up with the best record against the sides first, third, fourth, and fifth in their groups advanced to play-off matches on 25/26 and 29/30 October and 22/23 and 26/27 November 2014 for the remaining berth.

Seeding
Seeding was based on results in three tournaments, the UEFA Women's Euro 2009 qualifying, 2011 FIFA Women's World Cup and the UEFA Women's Euro 2013 qualifying, each with their qualification results included.

We report in bold the teams which actually qualified to the 2015 FIFA Women's World Cup.

Tiebreakers
If two or more teams are equal on points on completion of the group matches, the following tie-breaking criteria are applied:
 Higher number of points obtained in the matches played between the teams in question;
 Superior goal difference resulting from the matches played between the teams in question;
 Higher number of goals scored in the matches played between the teams in question;
 Higher number of goals scored away from home in the matches played between the teams in question;
 If, after having applied criteria 1 to 4, teams still have an equal ranking, criteria 1 to 4 are reapplied exclusively to the matches between the teams in question to determine their final rankings. If this procedure does not lead to a decision, criteria 6 to 10 apply;
 Superior goal difference in all group matches;
 Higher number of goals scored in all group matches;
 Higher number of away goals scored in all group matches;
 Position in the UEFA national team coefficient ranking system;

Group 1

Group 2

Group 3

Group 4

Group 5

Group 6

Group 7

Ranking of second-placed teams
Matches against the sixth-placed team in each group are not included in this ranking. As a result, eight matches played by each team counted for the purposes of the second-placed table.

The ranking of the runners-up is determined by the following parameters in this order:
Highest number of points
Goal difference
Highest number of goals scored
Highest number of away goals scored
Position in the UEFA national team coefficient ranking system;

Play-offs

After conclusion of the group stage the four runners-up with the best record against the sides first, third, fourth and fifth in their groups played home and away matches, to determine the last place in the FIFA World Cup.

The draw was held on 23 September 2014 at 14:00 local time at Nyon, Switzerland.

In the play-off draw, teams are seeded according to their UEFA Women's National Team Coefficient Ranking.

Semifinals

|}

Final

|}

References

External links
Women's World Cup, UEFA.com

 
UEFA
UEFA
UEFA
Women's World Cup qualification
Women's World Cup qualification
2015